The Balie P. Waggener House is a historic house in Atchison, Kansas. It was built in 1879 for the general counsel of the Missouri Pacific Railroad. It is listed on the National Register of Historic Places.

History
The house was built in 1879 for Balie Payton Waggener, an attorney, and his wife, Emma L. Hetherington, whose father, William W. Hetherington, was the president of Atchison's Exchange National Bank. Waggener was the general counsel of the Missouri Pacific Railroad.

Architectural significance
The house was designed in the Second Empire architectural style. It has been listed on the National Register of Historic Places since May 17, 2006.

References

Houses on the National Register of Historic Places in Kansas
National Register of Historic Places in Atchison County, Kansas
Second Empire architecture in Kansas
Houses completed in 1879